Somebody Help Me is a 2007 American horror television film starring Marques Houston and Omarion, written and directed by their music producer, Chris Stokes.

The film premiered on BET on October 31, 2007, and was released on DVD in United States on November 13, 2007.

Plot
Somebody Help Me is the story of Brendan Young (Marques Houston) and Darryl Jennings (Omarion Grandberry) as they head off with their girlfriends, respectively Serena (Brooklyn Sudano) and Kimmy (Alexis Fields), and friends for a weekend's stay at a remote cabin in the woods. After the couples settle in, things take an eerie turn. One by one, the group ends up missing or dead, while the remaining few are forced to band together to figure out who or what is behind these killings.

The murderer kills his victims by slicing off parts of their bodies. The killings in order include: Barbara (Jessica Friedman) having part of her head sliced, Andrea (Amanda Lee) having her entire scalp ripped off, Mike (Garristone Koch), Barbara's boyfriend having his eyes and fingernails ripped out, the sheriff having his throat slit, and Ken (Luke Fryden), Andrea's boyfriend having his teeth ripped out then being smothered to death. Nicole (Jessica Szohr) dies from an asthma attack when the man does not give her an inhaler.

The killer's daughter, Daisy (Brittany Oaks), sings "Ring around the Rosie" throughout the movie, and helps Brendan free the others in the end. Three of the teenagers end up dead, and Olsen comes in time to save Brendan and free Serena, Darryl, Kimmy, and Nicole's boyfriend, Seth (Christopher Jones).

The last scene is the murderer and Daisy having their car searched and the policeman letting him go as Daisy sings "Ring Around The Rosie" again.

Cast
 Marques Houston as Brendan
 Omarion as Darryl Jennings
 Brooklyn Sudano as Serena
 Alexis Fields as Kimmy
 Sonny King as Corbin
 Brittany Oaks as Daisy
 Stephen Snedden as Deputy Adams
 Christopher Jones as Seth
 Jessica Szohr as Nicole
 Luke Frydenger as Ken Thomas
 Jessica Friedman as Barbara Hilton
 Amanda Lee as Andrea
 Garrison Koch as Mike
 Donna DuPlantier as Nurse
 Irene Stokes as Store Clerk
  Todd Thomas as Officer, Road Block
 Jim Wilkey as Sheriff Bob
 John Wiltshire as Olsen
 Devonne Burch as Sean

Sequel
A sequel, Somebody Help Me 2, premiered on BET on October 29, 2010.

References

External links
 

2000s slasher films
2000s teen horror films
2007 films
2007 horror films
2007 television films
American slasher films
American teen horror films
American horror television films
Films shot in California
2000s English-language films
2000s American films